Pampore, known as Pampar or Panpar in Kashmiri, is a historical town situated on the eastern side of the Jhelum River on the Jammu-Srinagar National Highway. It was known as Padmanpur in antiquity. It is famous worldwide for its saffron and known as the Saffron town of Kashmir. Pampore is one of the few places in the world where saffron, the world's most expensive spice, grows. Areas of Pampore typically have -bal as a suffix, such as the localities of Namlabal, Kadlabal, Drangbal, Frestabal, and Letrabal. Pampore has three lakes as well which have been entitled as wetlands. One of the lakes is known as Sarbal Lake. The Sarbal Lake is situated on the way from Tulbagh to Wuyan through saffron fields near Chatlam. On the basis of its location near Chatlam, it is also known as Chatlam Wetland.

Etymology
Pampore was originally called Padampur.

Geography

Demographics

As of the 2011 Indian census, Pampore tehsil had a population of 60,613. Males constitute 52% of the population and females 48%. Pampore has an average literacy rate of 59%, lower than the national average of 59.5%: male literacy is 69%, and female literacy. As of 2011, Pampore town had a population of 21,680, males being 11,007 (51%) and females 10,673 (49%).

Politics
Pampore is an Assembly Constituency in the Jammu and Kashmir Legislative Assembly. With the new delimitation, it covers Pampore Tehsil, Pampore town, Khrew town and Kakapora Tehsil. Ratnipora is the most educated town in the constituency.

See also
 Srinagar railway station

References

Cities and towns in Pulwama district